Tomasz Nowak can refer to:

 Tomasz Piotr Nowak (born 1956), a Polish politician
 Tomasz Nowak (boxer) (1960-2013), a Polish boxer
 Tomasz Nowak (footballer) (born 1985), a Polish footballer